Fernand Choquette,  (October 27, 1895 – January 17, 1975) was a Canadian Quebec MNA and judge of the Quebec Court of Appeal from 1956 until 1970. He also worked as a lawyer for over 10 years and a teacher for over 20 years.

Born in Montmagny, Quebec, the son of Philippe-Auguste Choquette and Marie Bender, he received a B.A. in 1915 and an LL.B in 1918 from Université Laval. He married Marguerite Vallerand in 1922.

Defeated in the 1935 and 1936 provincial elections, Choquette served two terms as a member of the Quebec Liberal Party from 1939 to 1948 for the riding of Montmagny (now part of Montmagny-L'Islet).

In 1972 he was made a Companion of the Order of Canada "for his contribution to the advancement of law".

References

External links
 

1895 births
1975 deaths
Companions of the Order of Canada
Judges in Quebec
Lawyers in Quebec
People from Montmagny, Quebec
Quebec Liberal Party MNAs
Université Laval alumni
Academic staff of Université Laval